Gaius Amafinius (or Amafanius) was one of the earliest Roman writers in favour of the Epicurean philosophy. He probably lived in the late 2nd and early 1st century BC. He wrote several works, which are censured by Cicero as deficient in arrangement and style. He is mentioned by no other ancient writer but Cicero.  In the Academica, Cicero reveals that Amafanius translated the Greek concept of atoms as "corpuscles" (corpusculi) in Latin.

In his Tusculan Disputations, Cicero disapprovingly notes that Amafanius was one of the first philosophers writing in Latin at Rome:

In his Academica, Cicero criticizes Amafinius and his fellow Epicurean Rabirius for their unsophisticated prose style, and says that in their efforts to introduce philosophy to common people they end up saying nothing. He concludes indignantly: "they think there is no art of speechmaking or composition."

Michel de Montaigne alludes to these passages in his Essais, book 2, chapter 17, De la presumption ("On Presumption.")  Montaigne writes:

References

Bibliography
 Cicero’s Social and Political Thought, Wood, Neal, University of California Press, 1988 (paperback edition, 1991).
 Amafinius, Lucretius and Cicero, Howe, H.H., American Journal of Philology, 77, 1951, pp57–62

2nd-century BC Romans
1st-century BC Romans
2nd-century BC philosophers
1st-century BC philosophers
2nd-century BC Latin writers
1st-century BC Latin writers
Ancient Roman philosophers
Philosophers of Roman Italy
Roman-era Epicurean philosophers
Year of birth unknown
Year of death unknown